Memoirs of a Murderer is the debut studio album by American heavy metal band King 810 which was released on August 18, 2014, via Roadrunner Records. The album contains four tracks that were originally featured on both of the band's previous EPs (Midwest Monsters and Proem) along with 12 original songs, making a total of 16 songs. The album is the first of the band's efforts to chart, peaking at 18 on the Top Hard Rock Albums and eight on the Top Heatseekers, making this their most successful release to date.

Background 
Before the band announced the album, they had released two EPs; Midwest Monsters and Proem, both of which contained tracks that would feature onto this album. After they released Midwest Monsters, they were signed to Roadrunner Records to release Proem in June, to then announce this album a month after its release. The band had previously recorded material for a full-length studio album in 2008 but under the label Equal Vision Records with Chiodos guitarist Jason Hale, however, the band dropped from the label with Jason Hale departing from the band and no album was released, details regarding those recorded songs have not been revealed since.

Release and promotion 
When the album was announced, the band released a music video in July for the album's single "Fat Around the Heart", directed by John 'Quig' Quigley who has directed music videos for the likes of Eminem and Kid Rock. The next music video release was in August for the song "War Outside" which featured footage from the band's performance at 2014's Mayhem Festival. Then they released a music video for "State of Nature" in the same month. The album successfully released in August and is the first album to chart, peaking at 18 on the Top Hard Rock Albums and eight on the Top Heatseekers, making this their most successful release to date. They later released a music video in October for the song "Murder Murder Murder", then finally another one for "Desperate Lovers" in December. Along with the announcement of the album was plans to tour across the UK as a part of the Download Freezes Over tour in September. The band toured as a support act for Slipknot along with Korn, starting in Knotfest in San Bernardino, California in October and ending in the UK in January. As a means to promote the album further, they released a live promotional video, featuring footage of the band touring with the song "Desperate Lovers". In February 2015, the band's song "Killem All" was featured on Soundwave's compilation album Soundwave 2015 through Sony Music. In 2015, music videos for the songs for "Eyes (Sleep It All Away)" and "Devil Don't Cry" were also released.

Track listing

 Was originally released on the Proem EP.
 Was re-recorded from the Midwest Murders EP.

Personnel

King 810
 David Gunn – vocals
 Andrew Beal – guitars
 Eugene Gill – bass
 Andrew Workman – drums

Additional musicians
Gregg August – contrabass
Sara Caswell – violin
Noah Hoffeld – cello
Lois Martin – violin

Production
Josh Schroeder – producer, engineer, mixing
Justyn Pilbrow – mixing, producer
Brian Crowe – engineer
Ted Jensen – mastering
Sean Mosher-Smith – art direction, photo illustration

Management
Mike Liguori – A&R
David Rath – A&R

Chart history

Release history

References

External links

2014 albums
King 810 albums
Roadrunner Records albums